Anzor Irakliyevich Chikhladze (born 18 August 1949) is a Russian professional football coach and a former player.

Club career
He played 6 seasons in the Soviet Top League for FC Torpedo Kutaisi, FC SKA Rostov-on-Don and FC Shakhtar Donetsk.

External links
 

1949 births
Living people
Soviet footballers
Association football forwards
FC SKA Rostov-on-Don players
FC Shakhtar Donetsk players
FC Akhmat Grozny players
FC Spartak Vladikavkaz players
FC Chernomorets Novorossiysk players
Soviet Top League players
Russian football managers